The 2011–12 season will be SC Bastia's first season back in Ligue 2 since promotion from Championnat National in 2011. Ranked first in the league this season and promoted to Ligue 1. While the cup "last 32" round is struggling. More died in the first round of the League Cup.

Bastia, newly promoted from the National, welcomed Jérôme Rothen, Toifilou Maoulida, François Marque, Ludovic Genest and Florian Thauvin into the club. Bastia started off on a good note, falling off slightly in the autumn. From early February until the beginning of April, Bastia did not lose a single match. On 23 April 2012, in a full Stadium Armand Cesari, Bastia virtually secured their place amongst the elite by winning against Châteauroux (2–1). On 1 May 2012, Bastia became champion of Ligue 2, 44 years after its first and only league title, with their victory over Metz at Armand Cesari. On 11 May 2012, Bastia won its last game of the season at home 2–1 against Nantes thanks to goals from Jérôme Rothen and David Suarez. The club was also on a 2-year run of being undefeated at home. Bastia became part of the very exclusive club of teams undefeated at home in Europe. Several players played their last game against Nantes in the colors of Bastia, including David Suarez and Jacques-Désiré Périatambée.

Bastia won all the trophies UNFP for Ligue 2. Jérôme Rothen, best player, Macedo Novaes, best goalkeeper, and Frédéric Hantz, best coach, who placed five players in the team lineup (Macedo Novaes, Féthi Harek, Wahbi Khazri, Sadio Diallo and Jérôme Rothen).

Bastia has made this season in the seven-match preparation. Three of them won, drew two. In the remaining two were defeated. If uniforms, introduced on 27 June 2011.

Transfers

In

Out

Kits 
Kappa manufacrounded the kits for Bastia. Oscaro remained as the club's main sponsor. Was backpack sponsor; Géant, sponsor of the arm; Haute-Corse Conseil General, shorts sponsor; Corsica Ferries. In jerseys, introduced on 27 June 2011.

Friendly matches

Squad and statistics 

|-
|colspan="14"|Players who appeared for Bastia no longer at the club:

|}

Current technical staff

Competitions

Ligue 2

League table

Results summary

Results by round

Matches

Coupe de France

Coupe de la Ligue

Statistics

Squad statistics 

{|class="wikitable" style="text-align: center;"
|-
!
!League
!Cup
!LeagueCup
!TotalStats
|-
|align=left|Games played    || 38 || 4 || 1 || 43
|-
|align=left|Games won       || 21 || 3 || 0 || 24
|-
|align=left|Games drawn     || 8 || 0 || 0 || 8
|-
|align=left|Games lost      || 9 || 1 || 1 || 11
|-
|align=left|Goals for       || 61 || 17 || 2 || 80
|-
|align=left|Goals against   || 36 || 4 || 3 || 43
|-
|align=left|Yellow cards    || 68 || 6 || 2 || 76
|-
|align=left|Red cards       || 5 || 1 || 0 || 6
|-

Top scorers

League top assists

Disciplinary record

Reserves and academy

CFA 2

Reserve squad 
Updated 15 January 2012

League table

Matches 

Source: foot-national.com CFA2; Group D, Fixtures/Results and Corse Football Bastia 2011–2012 Updated: 31 May 2012.

U-19

U-19 squads 
Updated 1 February 2012

Matches 

Source: France Football Federation – Championnat National U-19 – SC Bastia U-19 Results/Fixtures. Updated: 31 May 2012.

U-17

U-17 squads 
Updated 3 February 2012

Matches

References 

SC Bastia seasons
Bastia